Ryan Waters is an American mountaineer, mountaineering guide, and polar skiing guide.

He runs the guide service Mountain Professionals based in Colorado, USA. In 2014, he became the first American to complete the Adventures Grand Slam, by climbing the Seven Summits and skiing coast to pole, unsupported / unassisted trips to the North and South Poles. To date he has guided clients more than 50 times to the Seven Summits.

In January 2010, Ryan and Cecilie Skog completed a "nice long ski tour" in Antarctica. The team skied 1,117 miles/1,800 kilometers over 70 days from Berkner Island in the Filchner-Ronne Ice Shelf to the South Pole, then continued to the Ross Sea completing the first ski traverse of Antarctica to the Ross Ice Shelf without resupplies or the use of kites.

He and fellow explorer Eric Larsen reached the North Pole on May 4, 2014 after skiing unsupported for 53 days from Cape Discovery, Canada. This expedition was made into a 2-hour documentary titled Melting: Last Race to the Pole, for Animal Planet television network.}

In September, 2015, he and Larsen also made the first ascent of 6,166m Jabou Ri in the Rolwaling area of Nepal.

In 2016, Ryan guided 3 clients on an unsupported full length ski trip to the South Pole via the Messner/Fuches route over a 44-day expedition. This is thought to be only the second time that a full-length unsupported expedition has been guided taking clients to the South Pole.And again in 2019, he guided two clients on a full-length unsupported South Pole ski trip from the Hercules Inlet start on Antarctica.

Ryan is the author of the 2022 autobiographical book An American's Grand Slam: A True Adventurer's Unlikely Journey, which he wrote with coauthor Hudson Lindenberger.

See also
List of Mount Everest summiters by number of times to the summit
Explorers Grand Slam

References

External links
 Ryanwaters.net
 Adventureblog.nationalgeographic.com

American mountain climbers
American summiters of Mount Everest
Living people
Year of birth missing (living people)